The Italian Footballers' Association (Italian: Associazione Italiana Calciatori), also referred to by the acronym AIC, is the association for footballers in Italy. It was established in 1968 and currently has 4,500 members, of which 2,500 are professionals.

The aims of the AIC are to protect, improve and negotiate the conditions, rights and status of all professional players by collective bargaining agreements.

History 
The AIC was founded in Milan, on 3 July 1968. Among the charter members there were notable footballers, such as Giacomo Bulgarelli, Sandro Mazzola, Gianni Rivera, Ernesto Castano, Giancarlo De Sisti, Giacomo Losi and Sergio Campana. The latter, who is also a lawyer and had retired from football a year before, was appointed president of the association. Campana held the position for 43 years, before announcing his intention to step down in April 2011. Former footballer Damiano Tommasi was officially appointed as the new president on 9 May 2011.

Gran Galà del Calcio 
Since 1997, AIC has held the Gran Galà del Calcio (formerly the Oscar del Calcio until 2011), a series of awards given to the best players, the best coach and the best referee of Serie A every season.

See also
 Super Formation Soccer 95: della Serie A, football video game licensed by Italian Football League and AIC (Associazione Italiana Calciatori)
 Ace Striker, football video game licensed by Italian Football League and AIC (Associazione Italiana Calciatori)

References

External links 
 

Trade unions in Italy
Association football trade unions
Trade unions established in 1968
1968 establishments in Italy
Footballers in Italy
Association football player non-biographical articles